Albert E. and Emily Wilson House is a historic home located at Mamaroneck, Westchester County, New York. It was built between 1949 and 1951 and is a "U" shaped, one story Colonial Revival style red brick residence with a low-pitched, gray slate gable roof.  The office wing was added in 1953.  The entry features a Dutch door flanked by small, steel casement windows.  It was designed by and the home of local architect Albert E. Wilson (1878-1955), who was a partner in the prominent firm of Peabody, Wilson, and Brown.

It was added to the National Register of Historic Places in 2007.

See also
National Register of Historic Places listings in southern Westchester County, New York

References

Mamaroneck, New York
Houses on the National Register of Historic Places in New York (state)
Colonial Revival architecture in New York (state)
Houses completed in 1951
Houses in Westchester County, New York
National Register of Historic Places in Westchester County, New York